Myloplus asterias is a medium to large omnivorous fish of the family Serrasalmidae from South America, where found in the Amazon River basin, as well as the north and the eastern Guiana Shield rivers.

References

Jégu, M., 2003. Serrasalminae (Pacus and piranhas). p. 182-196. In R.E. Reis, S.O. Kullander and C.J. Ferraris, Jr. (eds.) Checklist of the Freshwater Fishes of South and Central America. Porto Alegre: EDIPUCRS, Brasil.

Serrasalmidae
Fish of the Amazon basin
Taxa named by Johannes Peter Müller
Taxa named by Franz Hermann Troschel
Fish described in 1844